Dominique’s was a fine-dining French restaurant on the 1900 block of Pennsylvania Avenue NW in the Foggy Bottom neighborhood of Washington, D.C.. Dominique D’Ermo owned the restaurant until he sold it in 1987 Herb Ezrin, the restaurant’s clientele included such people as Warren Beatty, Ronald Reagan, Robert Redford, Ted Koppel and Frank Sinatra.  By 1991, it had gone into Chapter 11 bankruptcy and by August 27, 1994, all that was to be auctioned off had been sold.

Dominique’s was considered “as (far as) Washington restaurants go, as good a place to see — and to be seen — as any.” It was known for its “culinary exotica” such as alligator, llama, and hippopotamus and annual races on Bastille Day for their wait staff.

D’Ermo bought the former restaurant Jacqueline’s in 1972. Willie Morris, a writer for Harper's Magazine and a The Washington Star guest columnist, had dimmer there. Je wrote a rave review and by 1973, moved across the street to a larger space.

Naval Mehre reopened Dominique’s, with D’Ermo, at the Watergate complex at 600 New Hampshire Avenue, NW across from the John F. Kennedy Center for the Performing Arts. The plan was for the menu to be American Continental cuisine.

Controversy
In 1979, United States Department of the Interior herpetologist C. Kenneth Dodd, 29 years old, wrote a letter to D’Ermo, on official stationary, asking that Pennsylvania rattlesnake be removed from the menu because it was an endangered species. A Washington Star gossip columnist was leaked the letter   When the report appeared, and United States Secretary of the Interior Cecil Andrus found out what happened, he was furious (Dominique’s was his favorite French restaurant). Dodd was dismissed on Andrés’ orders. Environmental groups and members of Congress were calling for an investigation.  Andrus humiliated, Dodd was reinstated and D’Ermo loved the attention. He did offer to substitute another type of rattlesnake to replace it on the menu.

References

European restaurants in Washington, D.C.
Foggy Bottom
French restaurants in the United States